Complement component 8 is a protein involved in the complement system. It is part of the membrane attack complex (MAC).

A hereditary deficiency of C8 can result in increased susceptibility to Neisseria infections, such as meningitis and gonorrhea.

Structure
C8 is a heterotrimer; it consists of three different subunits. These are called C8 alpha, beta and gamma chains, encoded by the genes C8A, C8B and C8G respectively.

References

External links
 

Complement system